In physics, the term fundamental constant may refer to:
 Any physical constant which is part of an equation that expresses a fundamental physical law
 One of the fundamental dimensionless physical constants